Mindelight is a Mexican psytrance duo, composed of Hernan Arber (Eclypso) and Javier Calzada (Loco).  They have played in Mexico, Israel, Australia, France, Germany, along with main trance artists worldwide.

History

Origins 
Hernan Arber was born in Mexico City in 1979.  He has been a musician since age four, and studied at the National Conservatory of Music, before becoming a trance musician.  Javier Calzada became an electronic musician after becoming a fan of the techno and trance genres, and is currently studying Audio Engineering in Australia.  They met at a party in Mexico and after sharing mutual praise for each other, decided to form Mindelight.

Discography

Albums 
Light the Mind (2006)

Compilation albums

External links 
 Mindelight's official website 
Interview with Mindelight From Australia

Musical groups from Mexico City
Mexican electronic musical groups
Trance music groups
Mexican musical duos